This article presents a list of the historical events and publications of Australian literature during 1888.

Events 

 Angus & Robertson publish their first book, A Crown of Wattle, a collection of poetry by H. Peden Steel (unknown date)

Books 

 Rolf Boldrewood — A Sydney-Side Saxon
 Ada Cambridge — A Woman's Friendship
 Edmund Finn — A Priest's Secret : Under Seal of Confession
 Fergus Hume — Madame Midas : A Realistic and Sensational Story of Australian Mining Life
 Hume Nisbet — The Land of the Hibiscus Blossom : A Yarn of the Papuan Gulf
 Rosa Praed
 The Ladies' Gallery : A Novel with Justin McCarthy
 The Rebel Rose : A Novel with Justin McCarthy
 The Soul of Countess Adrian : A Romance

Poetry 

 Francis Adams — Songs of the Army of the Night
 Victor Daley — "A Sunset Fantasy"
 George Essex Evans — "Alone"
 Henry Lawson
 "Andy's Gone with Cattle"
 "Andy's Return"
 "The Blue Mountains"
 "Faces in the Street"
 Louisa Lawson — "To a Bird"
 A. B. Paterson
 "Old Pardon, the Son of Reprieve : A Racing Rhyme"
 "Uncle Bill : The Larrikin's Lament"
 Douglas Sladen — "Under the Wattle"
 James Brunton Stephens — "The Gentle Anarchist"
 William Charles Wentworth — "Sydney in 1822"

Short stories 

 Edward Dyson — "Mr and Mrs Sin Fat"
 Henry Lawson — "His Father's Mate"

Non-fiction 

 Ernest Favenc  — The History of Australian Exploration from 1788 to 1888

Births 

A list, ordered by date of birth (and, if the date is either unspecified or repeated, ordered alphabetically by surname) of births in 1888 of Australian literary figures, authors of written works or literature-related individuals follows, including year of death.

 18 March — Pat Hanna, dramatist (died 1973)

Unknown date
 Grace Ethel Martyr, poet (d. 1934)

Deaths 

A list, ordered by date of death (and, if the date is either unspecified or repeated, ordered alphabetically by surname) of deaths in 1888 of Australian literary figures, authors of written works or literature-related individuals follows, including year of birth.

See also 
 1888 in poetry
 List of years in literature
 List of years in Australian literature
 1888 in literature
 1887 in Australian literature
 1888 in Australia
 1889 in Australian literature

References

Literature
Australian literature by year
19th-century Australian literature
1888 in literature